Houlletia tigrina is a species of orchid that occurs from Guatemala to western Ecuador.

References

External links 

tigrina
Orchids of Ecuador
Orchids of Guatemala